The Mooretown Flags are a Canadian Junior ice hockey team from Mooretown, Ontario.  The Flags are members of the Provincial Junior Hockey League.

History

Founded in 1971, the Flags have won one Clarence Schmalz Cup as All-Ontario Junior "C" Champions.

The Flags have produced much in the way of alumni, including National Hockey League player Brian Dobbin.  As well as semi-professionals like Dan and Joe Gardner, and Jeff Perry and Ontario Hockey League players like Cory Pageau.

In 2006 the 1987-88 OHA Junior 'C' Championship team was inducted into the Sarnia Lambton Sports Hall of Fame.

Team Members were: Kerry Adams, Brad Allen, Mike Caley, Mark Cornelious, Ted Dupont, Tyler Fraleigh, Dan Gardner, John Germain, Shane Green, Shawn Jackson, Craig Lindsay, Seth Lippiatt, Brian McCabe, Lee McCabe, Shawn Muscutt, Ken Nicholson, Dave Oldale, Cory Pageau, Jeff Perry, Rob Purdy, Darren Thompson, Bob Waybrant, Ken Williams.

Coach - Mark Davis, Assistant Coach - Steve Degurse, Manager - Bob Haley, Trainer - Bryan Stack

The Flags are very successful in developing good players for their affiliate, the Sarnia Legionnaires Jr. 'B' team. A number of Flags made the jump to the Legionnaires in 2009/10. Legionnaire coach Jeff Perry acknowledged that fact in an interview with the Sarnia Observer, crediting the Flags management and coaching staff for their outstanding abilities to develop young talent.

The Flags had a very promising team in the 2019–20 season, finishing second in the PJHL Stobbs Division and sweeping their first two series in the playoffs. Unfortunately, the postseason was cut short the day Mooretown and Lakeshore were to open the division final series due to the COVID-19 pandemic.

Season-by-season record

2021-2022 team staff
President - Bob Barnes
General Manager - John Baker
Head coach - Mark Davis
Assistant coach - Jeff Perry
Assistant coach - Mark McCabe
Assistant coach - Norm Leger
Trainer - Steve Forbes
Trainer - Jason Bourdage
Equipment Manager - Norm Hansen

Clarence Schmalz Cup appearances
1988: Mooretown Flags defeated Port Perry Mojacks 4-games-to-1

NHL alumni
Brian Dobbin

External links
Mooretown Flags

1971 establishments in Ontario